The 2022 Korean Mixed Doubles Curling Championship (branded as the 2022 KB Financial Korean Mixed Doubles Curling Championship), Korea's national mixed doubles curling championship, was held from July 12 to 15 at the Jincheon National Training Centre in Jincheon, South Korea. The winning pair of Kim Ji-yoon and Jeong Byeong-jin became the Korean National Team for the 2022–23 curling season. They will represent Korea at the 2023 World Mixed Doubles Curling Championship from April 22 to 29 with the location still to be determined. Through regional qualifiers, the field was narrowed down from over thirty teams to just fifteen who competed in the national championship. The preliminary round was held in a round robin format which qualified the top team in each of the four pools for the playoff round.

Among the field of fifteen pairs were two members of the Kim Eun-jung rink that won silver at the 2018 Winter Olympics in PyeongChang, Kim Seon-yeong and Kim Cho-hi. They were joined by their partners Jeong Yeong-seok and Oh Seung-hoon, respectively, representing the Gangwon region. Other notable pairs were Jeonbuk's Um Min-ji and Nam Yoon-ho, who were one of the only duos to return from 2021, as well as Kim Ji-yoon and Jeong Byeong-jin. Kim competed in the 2021 World Mixed Doubles Curling Championship with partner Moon Si-woo while Jeong had just won the 2022 Korean Curling Championships the previous month. The defending champions, Kim Min-ji and Lee Ki-jeong did not participate due to Lee serving military duties.

Medalists

Qualification process

Teams
The teams are listed as follows:

Round-robin standings
Final round-robin standings

Round-robin results

All draws are listed in Korea Standard Time (UTC+09:00).

Draw 1
Tuesday, July 12, 9:00

Draw 2
Tuesday, July 12, 13:00

Draw 3
Tuesday, July 12, 17:00

^ Park Yu-bin / Lee Jeong-jae ran out of time, and therefore forfeited the match.

Draw 4
Wednesday, July 13, 9:00

Draw 5
Wednesday, July 13, 13:00

Draw 6
Wednesday, July 13, 17:00

Playoffs

Semifinals
Thursday, July 14, 13:00

Bronze medal game
Thursday, July 14, 17:00

Final
Friday, July 15, 10:00

Final standings

See also
2022 Korean Curling Championships

Notes

References

External links
Korean Curling Media (@curling1spoon) on Instagram
컬링TV on YouTube

2022 in curling
Sport in North Chungcheong Province
Sport in Gyeonggi Province
Sports competitions in Gangneung
Sport in North Gyeongsang Province
2022 in South Korean sport
July 2022 sports events in South Korea
Jincheon County